Sar Mastan or Sarmastan may refer to:
 Sar Mastan, Bushehr
 Sarmastan, Gilan